Crystal Palace Football Club is a professional association football club based in Selhurst, South London, England. Founded in 1905, the club first played in the Southern League, and competed in this league for eleven seasons before being elected to play in the Football League in 1920 as members of the Third Division. Palace won the Third Division in their first season immediately gaining promotion to the Second Division. The team achieved their highest league placing in the 1990–91 season when they finished in 3rd place of the First Division. In 1992 the 22 teams in the First Division broke away from the Football League to form the Premier League, Palace were relegated from the inaugural season in 20th place, level on points with 19th place Oldham Athletic but with an inferior goal difference. The team would rejoin the Premier League and be relegated after one season in 1994, 1997 and 2004. They won the 2013 Football League Championship play-off final to once again be promoted into the Premier League where they currently compete.

Crystal Palace's first team have competed in a number of nationally contested leagues, and their record against each club faced in those competitions is summarised below. Palace's first league match was contested with Southampton reserves in the opening match of the 1905–06 Southern Football League Division Two, with their first Football League match coming against Merthyr Town. They met their 115th and most recent different league opponent, Scunthorpe United, for the first time in the 2007–08 Football League Championship. The teams that Palace have played most in league competition are Norwich City and Watford, having played them 130 times. Palace have recorded more victories against Norwich City than any other club, with 57 victories. Norwich are also the side Palace have lost the most league games to, having been beaten by them 50 times. Coventry City drew 35 of their 110 encounters with Palace, more than any other club.

Key
The table includes results of matches played by Crystal Palace in the Southern Football League, the Football League and the Premier League. Matches from the abandoned 1939–40 Football League season are excluded, as are play-offs and matches in the various wartime competitions.
The name used for each opponent is the name they had when Crystal Palace most recently played a league match against them. Results against each opponent include results against that club under any former name. For example, results against Gillingham include matches played against New Brompton.
The columns headed "First" and "Last" contain the first and most recent seasons in which Crystal Palace played league matches against each opponent.
P = matches played; W = matches won; D = matches drawn; L = matches lost; Win % = percentage of total matches won
  Clubs with this background and symbol in the "Opponent" column are Crystal Palace's divisional rivals in the current season, the 2022–23 Premier League.
  Clubs with this background and symbol in the "Opponent" column are defunct. Reserve teams that Crystal Palace played in the Southern Football League are classed as defunct because they no longer compete in the English football league system.

All-time league record
Statistics are correct up to and including the match played against Manchester City on 11 March 2023.

Notes

References
General
For 1905–06 to 2010–11: 
For 2011–12 onward: 

Specific

League record by opponent
Crystal Palace F.C.